The Neville or Nevill family (originally FitzMaldred) is a noble house of early medieval origin, which was a leading force in English politics in the later Middle Ages. The family became one of the two major powers in northern England and played a central role in the Wars of the Roses along with their rival, the House of Percy.

Origins
The male-line origin of the Neville family first appears in surviving records not until decades after the Norman Conquest of England (1066) and Domesday Book (1086), which did not cover County Durham, the area of their earliest recorded landholdings. The male line of the Nevilles was of native origin, and the family may well have been part of the pre-Conquest aristocracy of Northumbria.  Following the Norman Conquest, most of the existing Anglo-Saxon aristocracy of England were dispossessed and replaced by a new Norman ruling elite, and although such survivals are very rare, continued landholding by native families was more common in the far north of England, including in County Durham, than in the south.

Ribald, son of Odo, Count of Penthièvre, received the Lordship of Middleham from Alan Rufus. Ribald was a male-line ancestor of the Ancient House of Neville since Middleham later passed by marriage and consequent female descent to the House of Neville. Before the Norman Conquest, the lands around were controlled by Gilpatrick. In 1069, William the Conqueror granted them to his Breton cousin Alan Rufus, who built a wooden motte-and-bailey castle above the town. By the time of the 1086 Domesday Book, Alan had passed the castle to his brother Ribald. Its earthworks are still visible at William's Hill. Alan also built the castle at Richmond.

Construction began in 1190 of Middleham Castle, which still dominates the town. The Nevilles, Earls of Westmorland, acquired it through marriage to a female descendant of Ribald in the 13th century. It has been dubbed the "Windsor of the North".

The male-line of the family can be traced back to a certain Uhtred, whose identity is unclear, although Horace Round (1895) suggests he may have been identical with the man of that name who was a son of Ligulf, a great Northumbrian thegn killed at Durham in 1080. His son Dolfin, called in the records "son of Uhtred", is first attested in 1129, as holding the manor of Staindrop (formerly Stainthorp) in County Durham, from the Prior of Durham. This locality remained the principal seat of the family until 1569, their chief residence being at Raby in the north of the parish of Staindrop, where in the 14th century they built the present Raby Castle. Dolfin was succeeded by his son Meldred. He in turn was succeeded by his son Robert FitzMeldred, who married the Anglo-Norman heiress Isabel de Neville, daughter of Geoffrey de Neville (died 1193), 2nd feudal baron of Ashby in Lincolnshire. Their son Geoffrey "de Neville" (d.  1242) inherited the estates of his mother's family as well as his father's, and adopted his mother's surname, but retained his paternal arms of Gules, a saltire argent. In Norman-ruled England, a Norman surname was more prestigious and socially advantageous than an English one. Already before the Neville marriage, the FitzMeldred family was a major power in the area: "In the extent of their landed possessions this family, holding on obdurately to native names for a full hundred years after 1066, was pre-eminent among the lay proprietors within the bishopric of Durham during the twelfth century".

Geoffrey de Neville married a certain Joan, as is apparent from a charter granted in 1273 by his son Robert de Neville (d.1282) to Marton Priory, Yorkshire, referring to "the souls of his parents, Geoffrey and Joan, and for the souls of both of his wives".

In the 16th century the Nevilles claimed that their ancestor Uhtred was descended from Crinan of Dunkeld, ancestor of the Scottish royal House of Dunkeld. As well as prestigious ancient connections with the royal families of both England and Scotland, this claim entailed a line of descent from the Bamburgh dynasty of Earls of Northumbria, attaching the Nevilles' later power in the north to a pedigree of pre-eminence in the region stretching back at least as far as the early 10th century. Modern genealogists have speculated about theories to connect Uhtred with his purported forebears, but none of these is supported by any direct evidence.

Rise to power

The family's wealth and power grew steadily over the following centuries. Their regional power benefited greatly from frequent appointment to such royal offices as sheriff, castellan, justice of the forest, and justice of the peace in various parts of northern England. This prominent office-holding began with Geoffrey de Neville's son Robert, in the reign of Henry III, whom Robert supported against the barons under Simon de Montfort. The Nevilles also held administrative office under the prince-bishops of Durham. Robert's grandson Ralph Neville was one of the founding members of the Peerage of England, being summoned to sit in the House of Lords at its establishment in 1295, and thus initiating the line of Barons Neville de Raby.

Service in the wars of the late 13th and 14th centuries against Scotland, and later in the Hundred Years' War in France was of key importance in further enhancing the family's standing. In 1334 Ralph Neville, Lord of Raby was appointed one of the wardens of the marches, the chief officers for frontier defence, and the Nevilles were habitually appointed to these posts thereafter. Ralph commanded the force that crushed an invading Scottish army at the Battle of Neville's Cross outside Durham and captured King David II in 1346. In the mid-14th century, the Nevilles became involved in naval defence as well, holding the post of Admiral of the North. During this period they also began to be appointed to high office at court and in the Church: the victor of Neville's Cross served as Steward of the Royal Household, and on his death was succeeded in the office by his eldest son John. John's brother Alexander Neville became Archbishop of York and was a close advisor of Richard II. As such, he was prosecuted, along with Richard's other leading adherents, when the disgruntled Lords Appellant seized power in 1386–9. He suffered the confiscation of his property but, as a clergyman, he escaped the death sentences imposed on his colleagues.

By the late 14th century, the family had acquired an extensive array of estates across northern England. Besides their original powerbase in County Durham, they possessed a large block of lands in northern and central Yorkshire and significant holdings in Cumberland and Northumberland. They also held scattered estates in Lancashire and further south in Lincolnshire, Norfolk, Northamptonshire, Bedfordshire and Essex. In addition to Raby, they acquired or built important castles at Brancepeth near Durham and at Middleham, Sheriff Hutton and Snape in Yorkshire. Although geographically concentrated, their main estates were organised into three different administrative units (receiverships), based at Raby, Middleham and Sheriff Hutton. These were respectively responsible for the holdings in County Durham, in north-western Yorkshire, and in central Yorkshire. Towards the end of the 14th century, Middleham became a second habitual residence of the head of the family.

Earls of Westmorland

The Nevilles' emergence into the highest echelon of the aristocracy received formal recognition in 1397, when the Lord of Raby Ralph Neville was created Earl of Westmorland by Richard II. By this time the Nevilles' power in the north was matched only by the Percy Earls of Northumberland, with whom they developed an acrimonious rivalry. These competing northern magnates enjoyed an exceptional degree of autonomy from royal authority, owing to the remoteness and insecurity of the region where they were established. The king, whose court was based in the south, had to rely on powerful lords from both houses to protect the border from Scottish invasion, counterbalance each other's influence, and help with general governance.

Although the family had previously been close to Richard II, Earl Ralph was quick to join Henry Bolingbroke when he landed in England to overthrow Richard in 1399. Shortly after Bolingbroke's successful usurpation, taking the throne as Henry IV, Westmorland was rewarded with marriage to the new king's half-sister Joan Beaufort. Henry extended Richard II's policy of bolstering the strength of the Nevilles as a check to the troublesome Percys. The family gained from the weakening of Percy power as a result of the Crown's suppression of a series of rebellions involving that family in the 1400s.

While increasing the political standing of the Nevilles, the royal marriage led to a serious split in the family. Earl Ralph had previously been married to Margaret de Stafford, and the title of Earl of Westmorland descended through his son by this marriage. However, he favoured his sons by his second marriage, who received the bulk of the family lands on his death. This led to bitter disputes over the inheritance and lasting estrangement between the Nevilles of Raby, descended from Margaret Stafford, and the Nevilles of Middleham, descended from Joan Beaufort.

In addition to his patrimonial inheritance, Ralph's eldest son by Joan, Richard Neville, acquired the earldom of Salisbury by marriage to its heiress. Salisbury's own eldest son Richard became Earl of Warwick by the same means. These marriages brought the family huge new estates. Those of the earldom of Warwick, inherited from the Beauchamp family, were concentrated chiefly in Warwickshire and Worcestershire, but with lesser holdings in County Durham, Devon, Cornwall and the Welsh Marches. The main Salisbury lands, formerly held by the Montagus, were widely distributed across the south-west, with clusters in Devon, Dorset, Somerset and Wiltshire. The family also acquired the barony of Latimer through the marriage of the first Earl of Westmorland's father, later passed on to one of the first earl's younger sons, and the baronies of Fauconberg and Bergavenny through the marriages of two more of those sons.

Wars of the Roses

Yorkist champions
Salisbury and Warwick became the most important supporters of Richard, Duke of York during the early stages of the Wars of the Roses. They probably hoped that a Yorkist seizure of power would bring a favourable resolution of major inheritance disputes involving Warwick, and of a sporadically violent struggle for preeminence in the north between Salisbury and the Percys. They were also connected to York by marriage, as he had married Salisbury's sister Cecily; their children included the future kings Edward IV and Richard III. In addition to their own wealth and armed following, the Nevilles' heft in this and subsequent conflicts was enhanced by Warwick's position as Constable of Calais and commissioner for the keeping of the seas. These offices gave him command of England's only significant standing armed force and control of a war-fleet. They also enabled him to develop close ties with the London corporation of the Merchants of the Staple, a major source of financial support, and to gain popularity with the discontented populace of London and the south-east, especially Kent, whom Warwick and his allies repeatedly stirred into revolt. York and Salisbury were both killed at the Battle of Wakefield in 1460, but Warwick helped York's son Edward, Earl of March, to depose Henry VI and gain the throne as Edward IV in 1461.

Among the family's rewards for their support was the elevation of Salisbury's brother, the veteran soldier William Neville, Lord Fauconberg, as Earl of Kent. He, Warwick, and Salisbury's younger son John Neville, now ennobled as Baron Montagu, directed the suppression of lingering Lancastrian resistance in the north, where the ousted dynasty clung on for three years after their decisive defeat at the Battle of Towton in 1461. The Percys were among the principal supporters of the Lancastrian cause, and following the death at Towton of Henry Percy, Earl of Northumberland, and the final elimination of resistance in the north in 1464, the Nevilles secured their greatest triumph over their rivals, acquiring the earldom of Northumberland for John Neville in 1465.

Disaffection and defection
Warwick, now the richest man in England after the king, was the power behind the throne in Edward's regime during its early years, but the two men later fell out. Their estrangement was due in large part to the king's secret marriage in 1464 to Elizabeth Woodville. This humiliated Warwick, who had negotiated an agreement with Louis XI of France for Edward to marry the French king's sister-in-law. Relations were further aggravated by the subsequent influence of the Woodvilles, who successfully opposed Warwick over foreign policy.

In 1469 Warwick seized control of government, in conjunction with his brother George Neville, Archbishop of York, and Edward's own brother George, Duke of Clarence. Their alliance had been sealed by Clarence's marriage to Warwick's daughter Isabel. Warwick and Clarence imprisoned the king and sought to rule in his name, but the new regime was unable to impose its authority, and Edward was released. The king refrained from punishing the rebels, but sought to reestablish a northern counterweight to the Nevilles by restoring the earldom of Northumberland to the dispossessed heir, Henry Percy. This meant depriving John Neville, who had remained loyal to the king when his brothers rebelled, of his title, lands and offices. Edward sought to retain John's allegiance by compensating him with estates in the south-west, the new title of Marquess of Montagu, and the betrothal of his young son George Neville to the king's eldest daughter and current heir, Elizabeth of York. George was made Duke of Bedford in recognition of his future prospects. All this, however, evidently failed to mollify Montagu.

Warwick and Clarence again rebelled in 1470, apparently aiming to put Clarence on the throne. Defeated, they fled abroad, where they made common cause with the exiled Lancastrians, marrying Warwick's daughter Anne to Henry VI's only son Edward of Westminster. When Warwick and other leaders of this alliance landed in England to raise revolt once more, they were backed by leading nobles still in England, including Montagu, who turned the troops he had nominally raised for Edward IV against the king. Edward fled the country and Henry VI was briefly restored to the throne, but Edward soon counter-attacked successfully, and Warwick and Montagu were killed at the Battle of Barnet in 1471.

Aftermath
Warwick and Montagu were never formally attainted, which would have meant the forfeiture of their property. Nonetheless, the victorious Yorkists did not allow the process of inheritance to follow its normal legal course. Montagu's estates should have passed to his son George Neville, Duke of Bedford, along with the considerable portion of Warwick's inherited possessions which had been entailed to heirs male, giving Bedford precedence over Warwick's daughters. However, in practice Bedford was denied his inheritance, while his engagement to Elizabeth of York was cancelled. He would eventually be deprived of his title by Act of Parliament in 1478, ostensibly on the grounds that he lacked the wealth required to maintain the standing of a duke.

The legacy of the Middleham Nevilles instead became the object of dispute between King Edward's brothers: Richard, Duke of Gloucester, and Clarence, who had returned to the family fold before the Battle of Barnet. Clarence, whose claim was founded on his marriage to Isabel Neville, gained the earldoms of Warwick and Salisbury. Gloucester acquired the old Neville estates in the north, establishing his claim by marrying Anne Neville, who had been widowed by Prince Edward's death in the final Lancastrian defeat at the Battle of Tewkesbury in 1471. The northern lands and clientage inherited from the Nevilles became Gloucester's main powerbase, and he adopted Middleham Castle as his principal residence until his usurpation of the throne as Richard III in 1483.

Reflecting the estrangement between the two branches of the family, the Nevilles of Raby, headed by Ralph Neville, Earl of Westmorland, had sided with the Lancastrians from the outset. Westmorland's brother John Neville, Lord of Raby was killed in the defeat at Towton. The line of the Earls of Westmorland survived the wars, but the loss of most of the ancestral estates through their inheritance by the Nevilles of Middleham and their subsequent downfall left the family a much diminished force.

Junior lines of the Middleham Nevilles also survived, including the holders of the Latimer and Bergavenny baronies, based, respectively, at Snape and at Abergavenny Castle. Edward Neville, Lord Bergavenny had for many years been forcibly deprived of his inheritance by his nephew the Earl of Warwick. During the wars, each of these lines of the family had fought sometimes alongside and sometimes against the core group of Middleham Nevilles led by Salisbury and Warwick.

Later history

The regional power of the northern magnates, already severely weakened by the losses suffered in the Wars of the Roses, was further diminished by the growing power of central government in the 16th century. In 1569 the Nevilles and Percys buried their traditional rivalry to undertake the Revolt of the Northern Earls, an attempt to overthrow Elizabeth I and replace her with the Catholic Mary, Queen of Scots. The rebellion was a fiasco, and the Earl of Westmorland, Charles Neville, fled into exile abroad. He was attainted in his absence, losing his title and lands. When he died in 1601 he left no male heir, thus extinguishing the senior Neville line.

The Latimer branch of the family had also died out in 1577, but the Bergavenny line endured. After the death of Henry Nevill, 6th Baron Bergavenny in 1587, his daughter Mary Nevill(e) fought a legal battle to be recognised as heiress to all the remaining Neville inheritance. Ultimately, however, these lands were split between her and her first cousin Edward Nevill, who inherited the baronial title. Her son Francis Fane inherited through her the very old title of Baron le Despencer; to him, the Neville family's senior title of Earl of Westmorland was recreated, and remains with his male-line descendants.

Edward Nevill's descendants were raised to the status of Earls and then Marquesses of Abergavenny. This line continues; the present head of the family is Christopher Nevill, the 6th Marquess. His family lands have been eroded through the passage of time (whether by subdivision or inheritance tax), but the main home, at Eridge Park in Sussex, has been in the family since 1448.

Titles

Members in the male line

John Neville, 3rd Baron Neville de Raby
1. Ralph Neville, 1st Earl of Westmorland, –1425
A. John Neville, Lord Neville –1420
I. Ralph Neville, 2nd Earl of Westmorland –1484
II. John Neville, Baron Neville –1461
a. Ralph Neville, 3rd Earl of Westmorland
i. Ralph Neville, Lord Neville
1. Ralph Neville, 4th Earl of Westmorland
A. Henry Neville, 5th Earl of Westmorland
I. Charles Neville, 6th Earl of Westmorland
III. Thomas Neville of Brancepeth (Disinherited branch)
a. Humphrey Neville of Brancepeth –1469
b. Charles
B. Sir Ralph Neville, d. 1458
C. Richard Neville, 5th Earl of Salisbury, 1400–1460
I. Richard Neville, 16th Earl of Warwick, 1428–1471 (two daughters)
II. John Neville, 1st Marquess of Montagu, 1431–1471
a. George Neville, 1st Duke of Bedford, 1461–1483
III. George Neville, Archbishop of York, 1432–1476
IV. Thomas Neville, 1443–1460
D. Robert Neville, d. 1457, Bishop of Durham
E. William Neville, 1st Earl of Kent, 1410–1463
I. Anthony Neville, Lord Grey
II. Thomas Neville, Viscount Fauconberg, (1429–1471)
F. John Neville (c. 1406)
G. George Neville, 1st Baron Latimer –1469
I. Sir Henry Neville (1437–1469), of Latimer 
a. Richard Neville, 2nd Baron Latimer
i. John Neville, 3rd Baron Latimer
1. John Neville, 4th Baron Latimer
ii. William Neville
1. Richard Neville
A. Edmund Neville
H. Thomas Neville, 
I. Cuthbert Neville, 
J. Edward Neville, 3rd Baron Bergavenny, 1414–1476
I. Richard Nevill, 1439–1476
II. George Nevill, 4th Baron Bergavenny, 1440–1492
a. George Nevill, 5th Baron Bergavenny, 1469–1535
i. Henry Nevill, 6th Baron Bergavenny, 1527–1587
b. Edward Neville, 1471–1538
i. Edward Nevill, 7th Baron Bergavenny, 1526–1588
1. Edward Nevill, 8th Baron Bergavenny, 1550–1622
A. Henry Nevill, 9th Baron Bergavenny, 1580–1641
I. John Nevill, 10th Baron Bergavenny, 1614–1662
II. George Nevill, 11th Baron Bergavenny, 1641–1666
a. George Nevill, 12th Baron Bergavenny, 1665–1695

Unknown connection 

 Sir Thomas Neville (d. 1387) of Hornby

Simplified (male-line) genealogy to 1795

Connections with other families

Coat of arms
see Category:Neville arms

Sources

Given-Wilson, Chris, The English Nobility in the Late Middle Ages: The Fourteenth-Century Political Community (London and New York 1987)
Hicks, Michael, The Wars of the Roses (New Haven and London 2010)
Offler, Hilary S., Durham Episcopal Charters 1071-1152 (Gateshead 1968)
Offler, Hilary S., 'FitzMeldred, Neville and Hansard', North of the Tees - studies in medieval British history (Aldershot 1996), XIII
Round, John H., Feudal England - historical studies on the eleventh and twelfth centuries (London 1895, 3rd ed. London 1964)

Wagner, Anthony, Pedigree and Progress - essays in the genealogical interpretation of history (London and Chichester 1975)

Young, Charles R., The Making of the Neville Family in England 1166-1400 (Woodbridge 1996)

References

External links
http://www.tudorplace.com.ar/NEVILLE1.htm
Cleveland, Duchess of, The Battle Abbey Roll, Vol 2, "Neuile"

 
Noble families of the United Kingdom